Indian Athletics League is a proposed league in India. It will be organized by Silvakaran Group . This tournament will also have similarities with 14-leg Diamond League Series. There will be 8 to 10 franchise with each having 2 or 3 foreign players. There will be 8 players per franchise for both Men and Women.

Current this proposal is put on hold by AFI Executive Committee.

References

External links
 AFI mulls franchise-based athletics league (The Hindu)
 Athletics Federation Of India planning to start franchise-based athletics league

Athletics in India
Professional sports leagues in India